Ellen McLaughlin is an American playwright and actress.

Early years
 
McLaughlin attended The Potomac School in McLean, Virginia for elementary school (through 9th grade). She subsequently attended Sidwell Friends School, in Washington, D.C., graduating in 1976. She graduated from Yale University in 1980, summa cum laude.

Writing 
In 1992, McLaughlin began adapting Greek plays, beginning with Electra, by Sophocles. For each adaptation, she reads as many English translations as possible, then begins to write her version. Each of her adaptations takes some liberties but retains the original play's basic structure.

Her plays include Septimus and Clarissa, Ajax in Iraq, Days and Nights Within, A Narrow Bed, Infinity's House, Iphigenia and Other Daughters, Tongue of a Bird, The Trojan Women, Helen, The Persians, Oedipus, and The Oresteia. Producers include: Actors' Theater of Louisville, The Actors’ Gang L.A., Classic Stage Co., N.Y., The Intiman Theater, Seattle, Almeida Theater, London, The Mark Taper Forum, L.A., the Public Theater in NYC, The Oregon Shakespeare Festival, The National Actors’ Theater, N.Y., The Guthrie Theater in Minnesota, and the Shakespeare Theatre Company in Washington, D.C., among many other venues.

Acting 
McLaughlin is also an actress, having worked on and Off Broadway as well as extensively in regional theater. She originated the part of the Angel in Tony Kushner's Angels in America, appearing in every U.S. production from its earliest workshops through its Broadway run. Other favorite roles include The Homebody in Homebody/Kabul (Intiman Theater, Seattle), Pirate Jenny in Threepenny Opera (Trinity Rep. Elliot Norton Award), Mrs. Alving in Ghosts (Berkeley Rep.) Titania in A Midsummer Night's Dream at the McCarter and the Paper Mill Playhouse, A Delicate Balance, (Arena Stage, Yale Rep.) Good People (George St. Playhouse, Seattle Rep.), Dear Elizabeth (People's Light and Theater) and Outside Mullingar (George St. Playhouse.) On Broadway, she acted in Angels in America: Perestroika (1993) and Angels in America: Millennium Approaches (1993).

McLaughlin's on-screen credits include Everything Relative, The Bed You Sleep In, with guest appearances on Law & Order.

Other professional activities 
McLaughlin has taught playwriting in numerous venues, from Yale School of Drama to Princeton University. She has been teaching at Barnard College since 1995.

She is a member of New Dramatists and has served on the board of T.C.G.

Her most recent publication, by T.C.G., is The Greek Plays.

Personal life 
She is married to Rinde Eckert, a theatre artist and composer.

Awards and honors
Great American Play Contest
Susan Smith Blackburn Prize
the NEA
the Writer's Award from the Lila Wallace-Reader's Digest Fund
the Berilla Kerr Award for playwrighting
NEA/TCG Theatre Residency Grant.

References

External links 
 
 
 

20th-century American dramatists and playwrights
1957 births
Living people
American women dramatists and playwrights
21st-century American dramatists and playwrights
20th-century American actresses
21st-century American actresses
American film actresses
American stage actresses
20th-century American women writers
21st-century American women writers
Yale University alumni
Sidwell Friends School alumni
Yale University faculty
Princeton University faculty
Barnard College faculty
American women academics